Charles Denton "Tex" Watson (born December 2, 1945) is an American murderer who was a central member of the "Manson Family" led by Charles Manson. On August 9, 1969, Watson, Patricia Krenwinkel, and Susan Atkins murdered pregnant actress Sharon Tate, Jay Sebring, Wojciech Frykowski, Abigail Folger and Steven Parent at 10050 Cielo Drive in Benedict Canyon, Los Angeles. The next night, Watson traveled to Los Feliz, Los Angeles, and participated in the murders of Leno and Rosemary LaBianca. Watson was found guilty of murder and put on death row in 1971, after two years in county jail.

Early life
Watson was born in Dallas, Texas, on December 2, 1945, and grew up in nearby Copeville. He was the youngest of three children. Watson grew up attending church locally, and was an honor student, editor on the school paper, and captain of the football team, and set a state record for the low hurdles at Farmersville High School. In September 1964, Watson moved to Denton, Texas, to attend the University of North Texas, where he became a member of Pi Kappa Alpha fraternity.

Introduction to Manson Family 

In January 1967, Watson began working at Braniff International as a baggage handler. Using free airline tickets to travel, he visited a fraternity brother in Los Angeles; there he became interested in the psychedelic and music lifestyle of the late 1960s. One day Watson picked up The Beach Boys' Dennis Wilson while he was hitchhiking and brought him to his house, where he was first introduced to the Manson Family who lived with Wilson.

Drug dealing and Bernard Crowe 

In December 1968, Watson left the Manson Family. He moved in with a woman who sold small quantities of marijuana and LSD to his friends, and became her lover. The two lived a reasonably normal life in Hollywood for a few months, improving their business, until Watson became restless and rejoined the Family. 

Following Manson's orders to "find money for Helter Skelter", Watson contrived to steal money from his lover's friend, Bernard Crowe. Crowe called the ranch, spoke to Charles Manson and told him he would come to the ranch and kill everyone if he did not get his money back. In response, Manson shot Crowe in the stomach using the same pistol that Watson would use in the Tate murders.

Tate–LaBianca murders

Tate murders

On August 9, 1969, as a member of the Manson Family, Watson led Susan Atkins, Linda Kasabian, and Patricia Krenwinkel to 10050 Cielo Drive, the home of Roman Polanski and Sharon Tate. They murdered all four people inside the house, and also Steven Parent in the driveway. Watson and his crime partners inflicted 28 stab wounds to one victim, Abigail Folger, alone.

LaBianca murders 

The following night, Watson and six others went to the home of Leno and Rosemary LaBianca. Manson and Watson entered the home. According to Watson's book Will You Die For Me?, Manson held the occupants at gunpoint while Watson tied them up, before the gang killed them.

Conviction
On October 2, 1969, Watson fled the Spahn Ranch and headed back to his native state of Texas. On November 30, 1969, he was arrested in Texas for the Tate–LaBianca murders. He and his lawyers fought extradition to California for nine months. Upon arriving in California, he stopped talking and eating, losing 55 pounds, and began regressing to a catatonic state. He was admitted to Atascadero State Hospital for a 90‑day evaluation period to determine if he was fit to stand trial. He stayed there until February 1971, when he was deemed able to stand trial.

On October 12, 1971, Watson was convicted on seven counts of first-degree murder and one count of conspiracy to commit murder. One week later, the same jury took only two and a half hours to determine that he was sane. On October 21, 1971, he was sentenced to death. He arrived on California's death row on November 17, 1971, but avoided execution when the California Supreme Court's People v. Anderson decision resulted in the invalidation of all death sentences imposed in California prior to 1972. He was found guilty of the murders of seven people: Abigail Folger; Wojciech Frykowski; Steven Parent; Sharon Tate Polanski, who was eight months pregnant; Jay Sebring; Leno LaBianca; and Rosemary LaBianca.

Incarceration
According to his prisoner outreach web site, Watson converted to Christianity in 1975. Will You Die for Me?, Watson's autobiography, as told to Raymond "Chaplain Ray" Hoekstra, was published in 1978. In 1979, he married Kristin Joan Svege. Through conjugal visits they were able to have four children (three boys, one girl), but those visits for life prisoners were banned in October 1996. After 24 years of marriage, Svege divorced Watson after meeting another man in 2003. Svege and Watson remain friends. He had become an ordained minister in 1981, and received a B.S. in Business Management in 2009 from California Coast University, a distance-learning college.

In August 1982, a Southern California‑based group, Citizens for Truth, submitted some 80,000 petition signatures and several thousand letters opposing Watson's parole. The group received support from Doris Tate, the mother of victim Sharon Tate. In later years the group, with Doris Tate and her daughters Patricia and Debra, submitted petitions with more than two million signatures.

In 2012, Watson disputed a request to release recordings made in 1969 with his defense attorney Bill Boyd. The recordings became part of a bankruptcy proceeding involving the deceased attorney's law firm. Members of the Los Angeles Police Department said they believed the recordings might contain clues about unsolved murder cases involving the Manson Family. Watson asked the presiding judge to allow police to listen to the tapes but not take possession of them. Judge Richard A. Schell ruled Watson had waived attorney-client privilege for the tapes after he allowed the co-author of his 1978 memoir to hear the recordings. The LAPD acquired the tapes, which allegedly contained Watson confessing to other murders, but reportedly no new information. In September 2014, Richard Pfeiffer, an attorney for Leslie Van Houten, said that he was considering subpoenaing the tapes to look for information that might help Van Houten in her next parole hearing.

Watson's own minimum eligible parole date was November 26, 1976; he has been denied parole 18 times since then, including two stipulations. He was most recently given a five-year denial of parole at a board hearing in October 2021. He remains incarcerated at Richard J. Donovan Correctional Facility in San Diego, California.

In popular culture 
 In the 1972 film Pink Flamingos graffiti on the wall in one scene says the words "Free Tex Watson".
 In the 2018 film Charlie Says, he is played by Chace Crawford.
 In Quentin Tarantino's 2019 film Once Upon a Time in Hollywood, a fictionalized version of him is portrayed by Austin Butler.
 In 2019, he was portrayed by Christopher Backus in David Fincher's Netflix series Mindhunter.

References

External links
 
 Will You Die For Me?. Abounding Love Ministries.
 

1945 births
20th-century American criminals
American male criminals
American people convicted of murder
American prisoners sentenced to death
American spree killers
Crimes involving Satanism or the occult
Criminals from California
Criminals from Los Angeles
Criminals from Texas
Living people
Manson Family
People convicted of murder by California
Prisoners sentenced to death by California
People from Farmersville, Texas